Peter Gosich (c. 1920s–1981) was a Canadian football player who played for the Edmonton Eskimos and Ottawa Rough Riders. He played college football at San Jose State University. He died in 1981.

References

1920s births
1981 deaths
Canadian football guards
Ottawa Rough Riders players
Edmonton Elks players